Artscape Theatre Centre (formerly Nico Malan Theatre Centre) is the main performing arts centre in Cape Town, South Africa. It was opened in 1971 and is located on reclaimed land in the Foreshore area.  The inaugural performance was scheduled to be Giuseppe Verdi's Aida but illness struck the title-role singer Emma Renzi and the production was replaced by CAPAB Ballet's Sylvia. Other productions in the opening season were Mozart's Die Zauberflöte in Afrikaans and Giacomo Puccini's Madama Butterfly.
The complex includes:
Opera House, seating 1,487 with provision for two wheelchairs.
Theatre, seating 540 but more or less depending upon whether the pit is used.
Arena Theatre, seating 140.

The Artscape Theatre Centre was originally commissioned by the Provincial Administration of the Cape Province and run by CAPAB (Cape Performing Arts Board). It was formerly known as the Nico Malan Theatre Complex, after the former National Party administrator of the Cape Province, Dr. Johannes Nicholas Malan (commonly known as Nico Malan), who initiated the project. The development and design was contracted to Murray and Roberts Construction now called Concor.

The centre was privatized and renamed in March 2001, when the Cape Performing Arts Board (CAPAB) was dissolved. , the CEO is Marlene le Roux.

The Artscape Theatre Centre is also the home of Fine Music Radio and oversees the Maynardville Open-Air Theatre in Wynberg, Cape Town. It also houses the Cape Town Philharmonic Orchestra  and the Cape Town Opera. The Cape Town City Ballet also performs there.

See also
 List of concert halls

References

External links
 

Cape Town culture
Theatres in South Africa
Concert halls in South Africa
Theatres completed in 1971
Buildings and structures in Cape Town
Tourist attractions in Cape Town
Music venues completed in 1971
Opera houses in South Africa
Ballet venues
20th-century architecture in South Africa